John Henry Andrews (26 May 1898 – 12 May 1974) was an English footballer who made 78 appearances in the Football League playing at left half or left back for Darlington and Southend United in the 1920s. He was on the books of Durham City and Grimsby Town, without representing either in the League, played non-league football for Shildon, and returned for a second spell with Darlington ahead of the 1929–30 season, but without playing league football for them.

Andrews headed the opening goal when Third Division Southend beat Second Division leaders Derby County by four goals to one in the fourth round of the 1925–26 FA Cup.

References

1898 births
1974 deaths
Footballers from Darlington
English footballers
Association football fullbacks
Association football wing halves
Darlington F.C. players
Durham City A.F.C. players
Grimsby Town F.C. players
Shildon A.F.C. players
Southend United F.C. players
English Football League players